The Missouri Southern Lions football program is the intercollegiate American football team for Missouri Southern State University located in the U.S. state of Missouri. The team competes in the NCAA Division II and are members of the Mid-America Intercollegiate Athletics Association. The team plays its home games at the 7,000 seat Fred G. Hughes Stadium in Joplin, Missouri. Atiba Bradley was named the 14th head football coach in the history of Missouri Southern on February 5, 2021.

History

The Lions football program began in 1968. Their first head coach was Jim Johnson. Under coach Jim Frazier the Lions won the 1972 NAIA Division II football championship.

Conferences
From its inaugural season in 1968 until 1975, Missouri Southern played as an independent program. In 1976, it joined the Central States Intercollegiate Conference in which the school won one conference championships before leaving to play as an NCAA Division II member of the Missouri Intercollegiate Athletic Association (later renamed Mid-America Intercollegiate Athletics Association) in 1989, where the Lions have since remained a member and have won one conference championship.

Championships

National championship seasons

Conference championship seasons

Playoff appearances

NCAA Division II
Missouri Southern has made one appearance in the NCAA Division II playoffs, with a combined record of 0-1.

All-time record vs. current MIAA teams
Official record (including any NCAA imposed vacates and forfeits) against all current MIAA opponents as of the end of the 2015 season:

Notable former players
 Rod Smith, a former wide receiver for the Denver Broncos of the National Football League. Smith has the 2nd most receptions of any undrafted player in the history of the NFL
 James Thrash, a former wide receiver for the Washington Redskins and Philadelphia Eagles of the National Football League.
 Richard Jordan, a former linebacker for the Detroit Lions of the National Football League
 Allen Barbre, a former offensive lineman for the Denver Broncos, Philadelphia Eagles, Seattle Seahawks, Miami Dolphins and Green Bay Packers of the National Football League
 Brandon Williams, nose tackle for the National Football League.

References

External links
 

 
American football teams established in 1968
1968 establishments in Missouri